North Sumatra is a province of Indonesia located on the northern part of the island of Sumatra. Its capital and largest city is Medan. North Sumatra is Indonesia's fourth most populous province after West Java, East Java and Central Java, and also the most populous in the island of Sumatra. It also the most populous province outside of the island of Java. It covers an area of 72,981 km2. According to the 2020 census, the province's population in that year was 14,799,361. The mid-2022 official estimate is 15,115,206.

North Sumatra is a multi-ethnic province. The Malay people are regarded as the natives of the east coast of the province, while the west coast of the province is mainly inhabited by the Batak (Pakpak, Angkola and Mandailing groups). The central highlands region around Lake Toba is predominantly inhabited by another Batak groups (Toba, Simalungun and Karo). The Nias people are natives to Nias Island and its surrounding islets. With the opening of tobacco plantations in East Sumatra during the colonial era, the colonial government employed many contract labourers for plantations, they were mainly Chinese, Javanese and Indian migrants, who were majority does not returned after end contract and decided to stay in the province. The recent rapid urbanisation also attract neighbouring people from Aceh, Riau and West Sumatera, which is the Acehnese and Minangkabau people presents, all these ethnic groups, with different background, tradition, and religion live together in harmony.

During the Dutch rule, North Sumatra was a government called the Gouvernement van Sumatra with an area covering the entire island of Sumatra, led by a governor based in the city of Medan. After independence, in the first session of the Regional National Committee (KND), Sumatra Province was then divided into three sub-provinces. With the issuance of the Law of the Republic of Indonesia (R.I.) No. 10 of 1948 on April 15, 1948, it was stipulated that Sumatra was divided into three provinces, each of which had the right to regulate and manage its own household, namely: North Sumatra Province, Central Sumatra Province, and South Sumatra Province. April 15, 1948 was later designated as the anniversary of the Province of North Sumatra.

History

Prehistoric Era 

Prehistoric relics in North Sumatra shows that the oldest population were Austro Melanesoid. Based on the types of artifacts that was found, it is evident that their dispersal took place in the Mesolithic era (Middle stoned-age). They spread to the eastern part of Indonesia to the island of Papua, and to the west the traces are found in North Sumatra, and the Malay Peninsula. Austro-Melanesoid people especially in North Sumatra lived off of snails and clams. The shells were broken at the ends and sucked for the contents, over time the shells became hills that we now find in some places in North Sumatra. For centuries they discard the shells until it becomes a pile of rubbish that experts call kyokken moddinger (kitchen waste), some of the clam hill was founded in Saentis, Hinai, Tanjung Beringin and several areas along Deli-Langkat shore and river banks.

Around the year 1000 BC came the second wave migration from mainland Southeast Asia,  the Young Malays or Deutero Malays. They settled on the coast and made a living from fishing or cultivating the marshy land for agriculture. Their villages were scattered along the big rivers that flow to the east coast of North Sumatra such as Besitang, Wampu, Asahan, Barumun and so on. The rivers mean a lot to traffic and fishing. At the mouth of the river grew larger villages, and became the center of government or Kingdoms. Relics of the Mesolithic era were found in North Sumatra, finely honed stone axes, bone tools, and painting materials.

Linguistic and archaeological evidence indicates that Austronesian speakers first reached Sumatra from Taiwan and the Philippines through Borneo or Java about 2,500 years ago, and the Batak probably descended from these settlers. While the archaeology of southern Sumatra proves the existence of neolithic settlers, the northern part of Sumatra was settled by agriculturalists at a considerably later stage.

New genetic research has found that the Nias people of came from the Austronesian peoples. The ancestors of the Nias people are also thought to have come from Taiwan through the Philippines 4,000 to 5,000 years ago.

Ten years of researching involving blood samples of 440 Nias people in 11 villages in Nias island showed the Y-chromosome and DNA mitochondria of the Nias people are very similar to the Taiwanese aborigines and Filipino peoples.

Early Historic Era 

The eastern coastal area of North Sumatra is located on the shores of the Straits of Malacca. The strait for centuries has been widely visited, both by Hindus and by Chinese traders, with the founding of Situs Kota Cina or Chinese Town site in Hamparan Perak. Meanwhile, at that time there was known trading port in western coast of Tapanuli that attracted middle age era traders to Barus, people became increasingly interested in  Barus, because of its camphor that was popular in Ancient Egypt. A kingdom in North Sumatra mentioned in the Tanjoore information from 1030 issued by Rajendra Chola  recorded the names of the states he defeated in one expedition to conquer Srivijaya. States that he mentioned were Sriwijaya, Malayur, Kendara, and the Panai Kingdom . Furthermore, the Negarakertagama Kingdom by Mpu Prapanca from the 14th century find several names of countries found in North Sumatra, Pane, Haru, Mandailing, Tamiang, Lawas, and Barus. The places were mainly defeated by the Majapahit.

The Earliest Kingdom that was present in the eastern coast of North Sumatra is the Aru Kingdom from the 13th to the 16th century. In its height the kingdom was a maritime power, and was able to control the northern part of the Malacca strait. The kingdom was initially established as a Karo polity. The indigenous population practiced native animism as well as Hinduism. During the 13th century Islam came to be practiced alongside the existing faiths. Aru's capital was located close to present-day Medan and Deli Serdang. The people of the kingdom are believed to have been descendants of the Karo people from the interior of North Sumatra.

The Batakland (the area that was close to Lake Toba) was be first mentioned in Zhao Rugua's 13th-century Description of the Barbarous Peoples, which refers to a 'Ba-ta' dependency of Srivijaya. The Suma Oriental, of the 15th century, also refers to the Kingdom of Bata, bounded by Pasai and the Aru kingdom, the batak mainly practism animism and cannibalism at that time, it was remain untouched and isolated from foreign culture and kingdoms like Srivijaya and Majapahit. Although isolated, the Toba people are established their own kingdoms even though it was only limited to villages, the Bataklands were divided into several kingdoms, which often also entered into ties for defense purposes, but each member was fully independent. Of the many kingdoms, the position of the King of Bakkara or known as Sisingamangaraja is considered more important. This more important position is due to customs and traditions which regard the area as the place of origin of the Batak people. The same thing happened to Nias people on Nias Island, the island remainei isolated during its early era although its people already conducted farming, cultivating, carvings, shamanism and paganism.

Kingdom, Sultanate, and Colonial Era 

Around the year 1500 in the east coast of Sumatra, there were several kingdoms, namely the Nagur, Aru, Panai, and Batangiou kingdoms. In the hinterland of Tapanuli the growth of the kingdom came from each of the pushers. Each bus was a small kingdom consisting of a single farm-owning family. In the area around the sixteenth century a kingdom began to emerge which was founded by the Descendants of Sisingamangaraja. This kingdom gradually expanded its influenced throughout Tapanuli to Angkola, Mandailing, to Dairi. Thus in the 16th century in North Sumatra there were three largest kingdom, namely Nagur, the Batak kingdom under the rule of King Sisingamangaraja, and Aru. The wars between the three kingdoms made it easy for outside influences to enter, from Aceh, Melaka, Portugal, Siak, and Minangkabau. The Sulatanate of Aceh succeeded in Islamization of the eastern coast, as in other parts of the Padri War succeeded in spreading Islam into the southern Tapanauli kingdom. As the result, the three big kingdom split into several small kingdoms and sultanate such as Deli, Serdang, Asahan, Langkat Sultanate, Maropat, Lingga kingdom and many more.

Malacca fell to the Dutch East India Company or known as VOC in 1641. This also affected trade in the coastal areas of North Sumatra because the VOC stopped the role of trade in Malacca and shifted to Batavia. For the North Sumatra area, it also resulted in more Arab, Chinese and Indian traders to came to the area. After Britain gained a position on the island of Penang, the British began to trade in this area. Until the nineteenth century, British trade with the east coast of Sumatra was very developed. In the 19th century there were important changes in this area due to the entry of Dutch influence. Prior to the nineteenth century, Dutch power was concentrated on the island of Java, and several places in the Moluccas. But in the nineteenth century the Dutch began to pay attention to areas outside Java, including North Sumatra. Since the handover of Indonesia to the Dutch in the 1814 Treaty of London which was renewed in the  1824 Treaty of London, almost all of Indonesia came under Dutch influence. However, the UK continues to strive for positions in several places that are considered important for trade, including several parts of Sumatra and in Kalimantan.

In the late 18th century, most of the Sultanates of East Sumatra and the British concession of Tapanauli hadd fallen to the Dutch East Indies, meanwhile the Dutch tried to invade Toba, Karo Highland, Nias and Silindung area with the help of Christian missionaries in a process of  Christianization, most known missionary at that time was Ludwig Ingwer Nommensen, he successfully spread Christianity into North Sumatra. The Dutch invasion into Batakland met resistance from the Sisingamangaraja XII that caused a war lashing 30 years, but at the end the area fell to the Dutch Empire and he was killed in 1907. After the Dutch were able to break the resistance of Sisingamangaraja XII in the Bataklands, North Sumatra
was completely under the influence of the Dutch East Indies government based in Batavia. As a colony, the Dutch began to set up new plantation such as Deli Maatschappij, London Sumatera  within east coast, as there was a worker shortage, the Dutch began importing labourers from outside Sumatra from Java, Southern China and Southern India, this was the first big wave migration of Javanese, Chinese, and Indian into North Sumatra that still exist until today.  North Sumatra was under the control of the Gouvernement van Sumatra with an area covering the whole of the island of Sumatra, was headed by a governor who was based in the city of Medan.

On March 13, 1942, Japanese forces entered Medan, by bicycle. The Grand Mosque was used as the a fortress. The troops landed on the east coast of Deli Serdang (Pantai Cermin) while in the Tapanuli, they're began occupanion through Sibolga. Then within a short time the Japanese army was able to occupy important cities in North Sumatra, resistance from the Dutch were almost nonexistent. When the Japanese army occupied North Sumatra, the leader of the Japanese Armed Forces was centered in Bukittinggi. Since officially the center of the Dutch government which was in Medan has been moved to Bukittinggi, the occupation was lasted for 3 years. In 1945 the Japanese occupation officially ended with Japan's surrender in the Pacific and two days later Sukarno declared Indonesian Independence; Indonesian forces spent the next four years fighting the Dutch for independence.

Independence and contemporary Era 

After independence, the first session of the National Committee of Regions (KND), Sumatra was then divided into three sub-provinces: North Sumatra, Central Sumatra and South Sumatra. North Sumatra province itself was an amalgamation of three administrative regions called Residencies: the Residency of Aceh, the East Sumatra Residency, and the Residency of Tapanuli.

With the publication of the Law of the Republic of Indonesia (R.I.) No. 10 Year 1948 on April 15, 1948, it was determined that Sumatra was divided into three provinces, each of which has the right to organize and manage their own governments: North Sumatra, Sumatra Province, Sumatra Province. The date of 15 April 1948 was subsequently determined as the anniversary of North Sumatra Province.

In 1946, there was a social revolution of East Sumatra, it began on 3 March 1946. Across 25 "native states", many sultanates were overthrown and mass killing of members of the aristocratic families were performed by armed pergerakan groups (Indonesian nationalists). To the opportunistic pergerakan militants (especially Communist Party of Indonesia members Xarim MS and Luat Siregar), the revolutionary movement was seen as one of the means for East Sumatra to be freed from colonial overlordship and to join the larger Indonesian National Revolution. Participants of the revolution were believed to be provoked by leaders to kill aristocrats and create violence. These belligerents had three prime objectives: to eliminate the sultans and aristocrats (who were seen as Dutch allies), to seize their wealth (as sources of funding for the Indonesian independence campaign) and to eliminate the region's feudal social structure. The revolution brought about the formation of the State of East Sumatra, which was dissolved when the region became part of the Indonesian republic.

The East Sumatra Union (Persatuan Sumatera Timur) had been formed in 1938 by the westernized Malay elites to reassert Malay and Simalungun ethnic interests through support from the Dutch. With the support of these Malays, the Dutch attempted to establish a federal Indonesia consisting of a Dutch-supported State of East Sumara. The threat felt by the Chinese also motivated them to co-operate with the Malay aristocrats, most of the Simalungun rajas, some Karo chieftains and the Dutch in creating the NST. Dr Tengku Mansur (a member of the Asahan royal family) was selected as head of state and the NST lasted from December 1947 to August 1950. While the Dutch wanted the NST to be seen as an orderly and progressive alternative to the republic, the western-educated aristocrats saw NST as a bastion for their own ethnic interests. The NST began to disintegrate as soon as Dutch military support was withdrawn. The short-lived state was viewed with suspicion, and Dr Tengku Mansur eventually surrendered authority to the republic in August 1950. Consequently, East Sumatra was merged into a larger province of North Sumatra, where it has remained till today.

In early 1949, the reorganization of government took place in Sumatra, with the decision of the Government Emergency R.I. No. 22 / Govt / Emergency Government on May 17, 1949, which abolished the post of Governor of North Sumatra. Furthermore, the Government Emergency Decree R.I. on December 17, 1949, established the Province of Aceh and Tapanuli Province / East Sumatra. Then, with a Government Regulation in lieu of Law No. 5 Year 1950 on August 14, 1950, such provisions were lifted and reshaped North Sumatra Province.

Following the Dutch-Indonesian Round Table Conference in late 1949, the Dutch withdrew military support for the State of East Sumatra and its local authority began to collapse. Dr. Mansur entered into negotiations with Mohammad Hatta to reunify East Sumatra with the Republic of Indonesia in May, 1950. East Sumatra merged with Tapanuli to become the province of North Sumatra on August 15, 1950.

Act R.I. No. 24 of 1956, promulgated on December 7, 1956, established an autonomous Aceh Province, independent of the Province of North Sumatra.

Geography 

The province of North Sumatra stretches across the island of Sumatra, between the Indian Ocean and the Strait of Malacca. It borders the province of Aceh on the northwest and Riau and West Sumatra in the southeast. It has an area of 72,981  km2. The province contains a broad, low plain along the Strait of Malacca on which the provincial capital, Medan, is located. In the south and west, the land rises to the mountain range that runs the length of Sumatra; the mountains here are dominated by Lake Toba, formed from the caldera of an ancient volcano. Several large islands in the Indian Ocean off the west coast of Sumatra are currently part of North Sumatra, most notably Nias Island and the Batu Islands.

There are 419 islands in North Sumatra province. The outer islands include the island of Simuk (Nias), and the island of Berhala in the Strait of Sumatra (Malacca).

The Nias archipelago consists of the main island of that name and other smaller islands in the vicinity, located off the coast of western Sumatra in the Indian Ocean. The administration centre is located at the city of Gunung Sitoli.

The Batu Islands consist of 51 islands including four major islands: Sibuasi, Pini, Tanahbala, Tanahmasa. Pulautelo is the administrative centre on the island of Sibuasi. The Batu Islands are located to the southeast of the island of Nias. Other islands in North Sumatra are Imanna, Pasu, Bawa, Hamutaia, Batumakalele, Lego, Masa, Bau, Simaleh, Makole, Jake, and Sigata, Wunga.

Half of provinces are high plateau that runs by Bukit Barisan mountains range, mainly around central to western coastal of provinces, the tallest mountain in the provinces is Mount Sinabung with elevation around 2,460 mdpl, and it is the most active volcano in the region. Activities of the mountain (cracks where steam, gas, and lava are emitted) were last observed at the summit in 1912; recent documented events include an eruption in the early hours of 29 August 2010 and eruptions in September and November 2013, January,  February and October 2014. Another volcano nearby are Mount Sibayak with 2,181 mdpl, the mountain produce crystalline sulfur, which was mined on a small scale in the past. Seepage of sulfurous gases has also caused acidic discolouration of the small crater lake, both of the volcanoes are located in the Karo highland.

Lake Toba is the site of a supervolcanic eruption estimated at VEI 8 that occurred 69,000 to 77,000 years ago, representing a climate-changing event. Recent advances in dating methods suggest a more accurate identification of 74,000 years ago as the date. It is the largest-known explosive eruption on Earth in the last 25 million years. According to the Toba catastrophe theory, it had global consequences for human populations; it killed most humans living at that time and is believed to have created a population bottleneck in central east Africa and India, which affects the genetic make-up of the human worldwide population to the present. More recent studies have cast doubt on this theory and found no evidence of substantial changes in population.

Additional studies in Lake Malawi in East Africa show significant amounts of ash being deposited from the Toba Caldera eruptions, even at that great distance, but little indication of a significant climatic effect in East Africa.

In North Sumatra, there are currently two national parks, the Gunung Leuser National Park and Batang Gadis National Park. According to the Ministerial Decree, No. 44 of 2005, the forest area in North Sumatra today covers 3,742,120 hectares (ha), which consists of a Natural Reserve Area/Natural Conservation Area covering an area of 477,070 ha, 1,297,330 ha of protected forest, 879,270 ha of limited production forest, 1,035,690 ha of permanent production forest, and 52,760 ha of production forest that can be converted.

However, the figure above is only de jure. In reality, the forests are not as large as the figures suggest. A lot of the forests are damaged, due to encroachment and illegal logging. So far, over 206,000 ha of forests in Sumatra has experienced changes in function. As many as 163,000 ha were converted to plantations and 42,900 ha were transmigration areas.

Governance 

The administrative centre of North Sumatra is located in the city of Medan, governed by a governor. Earlier, North Sumatra was included in a single Sumatra province when Indonesia became independent in 1945. In 1950, North Sumatra Province was formed including the former residencies of East Sumatra, Tapanuli, and Aceh. In 1956, Aceh split off to form a separate Aceh Province.

Administrative divisions 
North Sumatra is currently subdivided into 25 regencies and 8 autonomous cities (formerly municipalities). When originally created as a province with its current boundaries, it was composed of 11 regencies and 6 cities, but 14 new regencies and 2 new cities were created between 1998 and 2008. All these are listed below with their areas and their populations at the 1 May 2010 census, the 1 May 2015 Intermediate census, and the 2020 census, together with their official estimates for mid 2022. These in turn are sub-divided into 444 districts, which in turn are further sub-divided into 6,110 villages. With proposals under consideration to create three new provinces from parts of the present North Sumatra, these regencies and cities are grouped below according to the putative new provinces in which they are situated:

Nias Islands Region
.

This region contains the substantial island of Nias and various small offshore islands, including the Batu Islands to the south. Originally it comprised a single Nias Regency, but on 25 February 2003 the southern part of the island (including the Batu Islands) was split off to form a separate South Nias Regency. On 29 October 2008 two new regencies - North Nias and West Nias - together with the city of Gunungsitoli, were split off from the remainder of Nias Regency.

 # South Nias Regency includes the Batu Islands.

Tapanuli Region

This region comprises the southwestern part of the province on the island of Sumatra. When the province was created, it comprised 4 regencies (Dairi, North Tapanuli, Central Tapanuli and South Tapanuli) and the city of Sibolga. Two new regencies were formed on 23 November 1998 - Mandailing Natal from part of South Tapanuli Regency, and Toba Samosir from part of North Tapanuli Regency. The city of Padang Sidempuan was split off from South Tapanuli Regency on 21 June 2001. Two further regencies were formed on 25 February 2003 - Humbang Hasundutan from part of North Tapanuli Regency, and Pakpak Bharat from part of Dairi Regency. A new Samosir Regency was created from part of Toba Samosir Regency on 18 December 2003 (more recently, the remaining part of this regency was renamed Toba Regency). Another two regencies were created on 17 July 2007 - Padang Lawas and North Padang Lawas, both from parts of South Tapanuli Regency.

East Sumatra Region

The region comprises the northeastern part of the province on the island of Sumatra. It now covers ten regencies and five cities, but originally there were just six regencies. The new regency of Serdang Bedagai was formed on 18 December 2003 from part of Deli Serdang Regency, and the new regency of Batubara was formed on 2 January 2007 from part of Asahan Regency. Two further regencies were formed on 24 June 2008 - North Labuhanbatu and South Labuhanbatu  - both from parts of Labuhanbatu Regency.

Demographics

Population
North Sumatra recorded a population of 12,985,075 in the 2010 national census, making the 4th most populous province in Indonesia, with a sex ratio of 99.59 men per 100 women. The 2015 Intermediate census gave a total of 13,923,262, while the 2020 census gave a total of 14,799,361, and the official estimate for mid 2021 is 15,115,206.

Ethnic groups 

North Sumatra is a multi-ethnic province. The Malay people are regarded as the majority people of the east coast of the province, while the west coast of the province is mainly inhabited by the Batak (Pakpak, Angkola and Mandailing groups). The central region around Lake Toba to the northern Karo highland is predominantly inhabited by other Batak groups (Toba, Simalungun and Karo). The Nias people are indigenous to Nias Island and its surrounding islets. With the opening of tobacco plantations in East Sumatra during the colonial era, the colonial government employed many contract labourers for plantations, they were mainly Chinese, Javanese and Indian migrants, who were majority does not returned after end contract and decided to stay in North Sumatera. The rapid urbanisation in the province also attract neighbouring people from Aceh, Riau and West Sumatera, which is the Aceh and Minangkabau people presents.

Bataks make up 44.95% of the population, including the Batak Karo and Mandailing. The Javanese come second with 30.62%, the Malays add up to 5.92% and the ethnic Chinese comprise 5.75%. The Nias people make up around 4.10% and the rest are Minangkabau (2.66%), Acehnese (1.07%), ethnic Indian (1.00%) and other ethnic groups (1.15%)

The distribution of the tribes, clans, and ethnic groups in North Sumatra is as follows:
 Batak Toba : throughout North Sumatra, forming the majority in the Toba, Samosir, Humbang Hasundutan, and North Tapanuli Regencies.
 Batak Karo : mostly in the Karo Regency, Deli Serdang and Langkat Regencies, including Berastagi and Kabanjahe.
 Batak Mandailing: majority along the western coast: (South Tapanuli, Padang Lawas, Mandailing Natal, Central Tapanuli), and the rest in Medan, Padangsidempuan, Sibolga and Rantauprapat.
 Batak Pakpak : majority in Dairi Regency and Sidikalang.
 Batak Simalungun : majority in Simalungun and Pematangsiantar
 Batak Angkola : majority in North Tapanuli, Gunung Tua, North Padang Lawas, and South Tapanuli
 Malay : mostly in the east coast rurals, especially Langkat and Asahan.
 Nias : mostly in Nias Island (including Gunungsitoli), with a small population around the west coast.
 Javanese : mostly reside in east coast rural areas, and in west coast areas like Deli Serdang, Serdang Bedagai, Asahan and Labuhan Batu Regencies, and in urban communities like Medan and Tebingtinggi.
 Minangkabau people : mostly in Medan, Sibolga and Mandailing Natal.
 Indian : major east coast cities such as; Medan, Binjai, Tebing Tinggi, Pematangsiantar, Kisaran, Tanjungbalai and Deli Serdang.
 Acehnese people : Medan, Binjai up to northern parts such as Langkat.
 Chinese : major cities such as; Medan metropolitan area: (Medan, Binjai, Deli Serdang), Tanjungpura, Stabat, Tebing Tinggi, Tanjungbalai, Kisaran, Limapuluh, Rantauprapat, Pematangsiantar, Balige, Sibolga, Padangsidempuan, and Gunungsitoli.

Languages 
In general, the widely used language is Indonesian. The Malays around Deli Serdang and Langkat mostly speak the Malay language, which is similar to the Peraknese Malay language. The Javanese people, especially around rural and plantation areas, use Javanese in daily conversation, while the urban Javanese mostly speak Indonesian.

The Batak people speak Bataknese, which is divided into four dialects (Silindung, Samosir, Humbang and Toba). The Batak Karo people use the Karo language, and the Batak Mandailing people around South Tapanauli, Padang Lawas and Mandailing Natal speak the Mandailing language. The Nias language is spoken among the Nias people.

Mostly ethnic Chinese in North Sumatra are fluent in Hokkien, with small communities speaking Cantonese, Hainanese and Mandarin unlike their counterpart in other part of Indonesia. Most Indians in and around Medan speak Tamil and Punjabi. The Acehnese people speak the Aceh and Gayo languages.

Religion

More than 95 percent of all residents are either Muslim or Christian; the remainder are Buddhists, Hindus, or follow folk religions such as Confucians, Parmalim, and Taoists. These are the recognized religions of North Sumatra:
 Islam: especially embraced by the Malays, Minangkabau, Javanese, Aceh, Mandailing, Angkola, partly Nias, and partly Batak Toba, Karo, Simalungun and Pakpak
 Christianity (Protestantism and Catholicism): especially embraced by Batak Toba, Karo, Simalungun, Nias, Pakpak and partly Batak Angkola, partly Javanese, Chinese and Indian
 Buddhism: mainly embraced by Chinese in urban areas
 Confucianism, Taoism and Chinese folk religion: predominantly embraced by Chinese in urban areas
 Hinduism and Sikhism: especially embraced by Indian in urban areas, there are also small Batak Karo people that practising Hinduism in rural areas
 Traditional religion such as Parmalim/Pemena: embraced by most of the Batak tribe centered in Huta Tinggi, Laguboti district, Toba Samosir Regency

Culture 
North Sumatra hosted various ethnics, religion and tradition, the cultures of North Sumatra mainly based by Batak, Malay and Nias, as the homeland of them respective ethnics, with adding other cultures such as Chinese, Indian and Javanese. The culture are often promoted as tourism agenda by the province and national government as to show to the public that North Sumatra has differences culture and tradition but united as one part of provinces.

Music 
The music that is usually played depends on the traditional ceremonies held, but is more dominant with the drums. As in the Coastal Ethnic, there are a musical instruments that called as Sikambang.

The Batak Toba, Pakpak and Simalungun tribes have a musical instrument called Gondang which is usually sounded during traditional ceremonies in marriage, death, and so on. Meanwhile, the Mandailing and Angkola Batak tribes have musical instruments similar to the gondang, namely Gordang Sambilan. The Malays in the East Coast have the same musical instruments as the Malays in general, such as the accordion, the Malay drum (kompang) and the violin. Meanwhile, in Tanah Karo, there are Kulcapi and Gendang musical instruments which are commonly used to accompany the Landek or Guro Guro Aron dance.

Architecture 

In the field of fine arts that stands out is the traditional house architecture which is a combination of the results of sculpture and carving as well as the results of handicrafts. Traditional house architecture is found in various forms of ornament. In general, the shape of the traditional house building in the Batak traditional group symbolizes "buffalo standing upright". This is even clearer by decorating the top of the roof with buffalo heads.

The traditional house of the Batak Toba ethnic, Ruma Batak, stands strong and majestic and is still commonly found in Samosir and Lake Toba area. The Batak Karo traditional house looks big and taller than other traditional houses. The roof is made of palm fiber and is usually supplemented with smaller triangular roofs called ayo-ayo rumah, Jambur and tersek. With soaring multi-layered roofs, Karo's house has a distinctive shape compared to other traditional houses that only have one roof in North Sumatra, there are still several villages in Karo highland that still reserve traditional house and buildings, like in Lingga. The shape of the traditional house in the Batak Simalungun area is quite attractive. The traditional house complex in Pematang Purba village consists of several buildings, namely the Rumah Bolon, Balai Bolon, drying rack, taboo hall of need, and mortar. The prominent Mandailing buildings are called Bagas Gadang (house of Namora Natoras) and  Sopo Godang (customary consultation hall).

Malay traditional houses in North Sumatra are not much different from Malay houses in other provinces, only the green and yellow color is more dominant.

Dances 

The traditional dance repertoire includes various types. Some are magical, in the form of sacred dances, and some are just entertainment in the form of profane dances. In addition to traditional dances which are part of traditional ceremonies, sacred dances are usually danced by dayu-datu. Included in this type of dance are teacher dances and stick dances. Datu danced while swinging a magic stick called Tunggal Panaluan.

Profane dance is usually a young social dance that is danced at a happy party. Tortor is danced at the wedding ceremony. Usually danced by the audience including the bride and young people. These youth dances, for example morah-morah, parakut, sipajok, patam-patam and kebangkiung. Magical dances, such as the Nasiaran Tortor Dance, Tunggal Panaluan Tortor Dance. This magical dance is usually performed with great solemnity.

Besides Batak dances, there are also Malay dances such as Serampang XII, Gundala-Gundala and Landek dance from Karo Highlands, Moyo and Maena dance from Nias

Handicraft
In addition to architecture, weaving is an interesting craft art from the Batak tribe. Examples of this weave are ulos cloth and songket cloth. Ulos is a traditional Batak cloth used in wedding ceremonies, death, building houses, arts, etc. Ulos cloth is made of cotton or hemp yarn. Ulos colors are usually black, white, and red which have certain meanings. While other colors are symbols of the variety of life. In the Pakpak tribe there is a weave known as oles. Usually the base color of the ointment is black-brown or white. In the Karo tribe there is a weave known as uis. Usually uis base colors are dark blue and reddish. In the west coast community there is a woven fabric known as Songket Barus. Usually the basic color of this craft is Dark Red or Yellow Gold.

Batubara Malay Songket is one of the typical crafts of the East Coast that has been worldwide. Songket Batu Bara has its own characteristics, this can be seen from: The process of making songket still uses wooden looms in the traditional way, but still has good quality, thus this songket is not inferior to songket produced with today's sophisticated machines. The Batubara songket also has a variety of unique motifs such as: Bamboo shoots, Mangosteen flowers, Cempaka flowers, Caul buds, Tolak Betikam, and Fighting Dragons. The Batu Bara songket woven has an attractive design and a high cultural artistic value.

Culinary

Typical food in North Sumatra varies greatly, depending on the region. It is the only provinces in Sumatra island and may one of provinces in Indonesia that has serves non-halal based food such as pork and alcohol, as around 40 percent of provinces are not Muslim. Saksang and Babi panggang karo are very familiar to those who carry out parties or home cooking. For example, in the Pakpak Dairi area, Pelleng is a typical food with very spicy spices. Tne characteristic of Batak cuisine is its preference to andaliman (Zanthoxylum acanthopodium) as the main spice. That is why andaliman in Indonesia sometimes dubbed as Batak pepper., in the Batak land itself there is dengke naniarsik which is fish that is fried without using coconut. For taste, Batak land is heaven for lovers of coconut milk and spicy food. Pasituak Natonggi or money to buy sweet palm wine is a very familiar term there, describing how close palm wine or nira is to their lives. Batak people are majority Christian — unlike neighboring Muslim-majority ethnic groups such as Aceh and Minang — Christian Batak people are not restricted to Islamic halal dietary law.

Many of the Batak's popular meals are made of pork as well as dishes made from unusual ingredients, such as dog meat or blood, however there are also halal batak dishes, mostly chicken, beef, lamb, mutton, and freshwater fishes, with large population of Batak Muslim, especially among Mandailing people, they made their own dishes such as Sayur daun ubi tumbuk or mashed-cassava leaves soup, Pora-pora, Salai ikan, Pakkat and others. Batak culinary centers are located in towns of Batak highlands, such as the town of Kabanjahe and Berastagi in Tanah Karo area. While some towns around the Lake Toba offers freshwater fish dishes such as carp arsik. The Northern Sumatra capital of Medan is also a Batak cuisine hotspot where numerous of Lapo (Batak eating restaurant) can be found anywhere across the province, it even expanded into neighbouring provinces such as Riau, Riau Islands, even capital Jakarta and neighbouring country like in Penang, Malaysia and Singapore.

The North Sumatra's Malay cuisine are same with another Malays region, meals such as Nasi lemak (called as Nasi Gurih), Bubur pedas, Lemang and dodol are main most known food from Medan and east coast. The Chinese has quite a lot contributed into province's cuisine, many type of meals and cakes such as Cha Sio,  Tau Kua He Ci, Popia, Bakpao, Teng-Teng, Chai Pao, Roti Kacang and Bika ambon are popular elsewhere in Indonesia. Indian in the province add more varieties by brought several meals such as Martabak, Roti canai, Putu bambu and Mie rebus. The Minangkabau and Acehnese making it complete by brought Nasi padang and Mie Aceh, these all food and cuisine can be found easily in every part in the province.

Economy

Energy 
North Sumatra is rich in natural resources such as natural gas in the area of Tandam, Binjai and petroleum in Pangkalan Brandan, Langkat which has been explored since the days of the Dutch East Indies. Besides that, in Kuala Tanjung, Asahan, there are the company named PT Inalum (abbreviated of Indonesia Aluminium) that engaged in ore mining and smelting of aluminium which is the only one in Southeast Asia.

The rivers that disgorge in the mountains around Lake Toba is also a natural resource that is potential enough to be an exploited to resource of hydropower plants. Asahan hydropower which is the largest hydropower plant in Sumatra Island is located on Porsea in Toba Samosir Regency.

Moreover, in the mountains there are many geothermal hot spots were very likely to be developed as a source of thermal energy or steam that can then be transformed into electrical energy.

Agriculture and farming 

The province is famous for its plantation area, until now, the plantation economy of the province remains to be excellent. The plantations are managed by private companies and the state. SOE Plantation area is located in North Sumatra, among others PT Perkebunan Nusantara II (PTPN II), PTPN IV and PTPN III.

Besides North Sumatra is also famous for its plantation area. Until now, the plantation economy of the province remains to be excellent. The plantations are managed by private companies also the state. North Sumatra produces rubber, cocoa, tea, palm oil, coffee, cloves, coconut, cinnamon, and tobacco. The plantation is spread in East coast area such as Deli Serdang, Serdang Bedagai Langkat, Simalungun, Asahan, Labuhan Batu, and also around west coast: Central and South Tapanuli. Plantations, especially palm oil, are important for sourcing reticulated and blood pythons, the skins of which are a major export product

 The size of rice farming. In 2005 the total area of 807.302 hectares of crops stay, or down about 16.906 hectares compared to 2004 reaching vast 824.208 hectares. The productivity of rice plants in 2005 was able to be increased to 43.49 quintals per hectare ranges from 2004 are still 43.13 quintals per hectare, and the rice crop fields change into 26.26 quintals of 24.73 quintals per hectare. In 2005, the rice surplus in North Sumatra reached 429 tons from about 1/2/27 million tonnes of total rice production in this area.
 The size of rubber plantations. In 2002 the total area of rubber plantations in Sumatra is 489.491 hectares with a production of 443.743 tonnes. While in 2005, the area under rubber decreased or stayed 477,000 hectares with production also dropped to only 392,000 tons.
 Irrigation: The size of technical irrigation entirely in North Sumatra is 132.254 ha that covers an area of 174 irrigation site. A total of 96.823 ha at 7 Irrigation area is very critical damage.
 Agricultural Products: North Sumatra produces rubber, cocoa, tea, palm oil, coffee, cloves, coconut, cinnamon, and tobacco. These commodities have been exported to many countries and contributing huge foreign exchange for Indonesia. In addition to commodities, North Sumatra is also known as a producer of horticultural commodities (vegetables and fruits); e.g. Medanese Orange, Deli Guava, Cabbage Vegetable, Tomato, Potato and Carrot generated by Karo, Simalungun and North Tapanuli. The horticultural products have been exported to Malaysia and Singapore.

Sumatra Mandheling and Sumatra Lintong coffee beans are grown in North Sumatra and largely exported to the United States. Mandheling is named after the similarly spelt Mandailing people located in North Sumatra, Indonesia. The name is the result of a misunderstanding by the first foreign purchaser of the variety, and no coffee is actually produced in the "Mandailing region". Lintong on the other hand, is named after the Lintong district, also located in North Sumatra.

Banking 
In addition to national banks, state banks and international banks, currently there are 61 units of Credited Peoples Banks (BPR) and 7 Credited Sharia Bank (BPRS). Data from Bank Indonesia showed, in January 2006, the Third Party Funds (TPF), which absorbed BPR reached Rp253,366,627,000 (around US$19 million) and loans reached Rp260.152.445.000 (around US$19.5 million). While assets reached Rp340,880,837,000 (US$25.5 million).

Mining 
There are three leading mining company in North Sumatra:
 Sorikmas Mining (SMM), main base around South Tapanauli with gold as main commodity
 Newmont Horas Nauli (PTNHN).
 Dairi Prima Mineral

Industry 
North Sumatra has several industrial sites, mainly around Deli Serdang. Medan Industrial Area stands for KIM is the main industrial complex in Medan.

Sei Mangkei Industrial Area

Sei Mangkei Industrial Area, also known as Sei Mangkei – Integrated Sustainable Palm Oil Cluster (SM-ISPOIC), is located in Simalungun Regency and was formally opened on 12 June 2010. Four companies have joined in this area, with investment costs totaling up to Rp1.5 trillion ($176 million). In April 2011, three other companies also joined in the Sei Mangkei area. They are Procter & Gamble Co for making CPO derivatives of cosmetic raw materials, Ferrostaal AG and Fratelli Gianazza SpA.

Exports and imports 

The increasingly higher economic performance of Sumatra and Java means that North Sumatran exports will be experiencing rapid growth. In 2004, the size of the foreign exchange sector had reached $4.24 billion, up 57.7% from 2003.

Coffee exports from North Sumatra reached a record high of 46,290 tonnes with Japan as the main export destination countries during the last five years. Sumatran coffee exports are also listed as the top 10 highest export products with a value of US$3.25 million or 47200.8 tons from January to October 2005.

Of the garment sector, garment exports tend to fall in January 2006. The results of special apparel industry down 42.59% from US$1,066,124 in 2005, to US$2,053 in 2006 in the same month.

Import export performance of some industrial products showed a decline. Namely furniture fell 22.83% from US$558,363 (2005) to US$202,630 (2006), plywood down 24.07 percent from US$19,771 to US$8,237, misteric acid down 27.89% from US$115,362 into US$291,201, stearic acid dropped 27.04% from US$792,910 to US$308,020, and soap noodles down 26% from US$689,025 to US$248,053.

Export performance of agricultural imports also decreased the essential oil dropped 18 percent from US$162,234 to US$773,023, seafood / shrimp, coconut oil and robusta coffee also dropped quite dramatically to 97 per cent. Some commodities were increased (a value of over US $ Million) is cocoa, horticulture, arabica coffee, palm oil, natural rubber, seafood (non shrimp). For the results of the molding industry, vehicle tires and rubber gloves.

Tourism 
North Sumatra has lots of travel destinations. According to Ministry of Tourism, North Sumatra is ranked on the top 10 most visited province in Indonesia. There are various kinds of tourist destinations that could be found throughout the province, Berastagi is best known as a hilly place with a cooler temperature as the whole province is in tropical region. Lake Toba is also a popular travel destination. Toba is a large volcanic lake which has an island inside of it, Samosir Island. Nias Island and other several islands nearby named Batu Islands is a popular spot for surfing. The capital itself, Medan, has many places of interest, mainly for its historical sites. The city is also known for its variety of cuisine. The list below is the most known places of interest in North Sumatra:

 Medan is the capital of North Sumatra province with a diverse crowd population of tribes and religions in unity. There are many historical tourist objects to spot and various great cuisine to taste in Medan.
 Lake Toba is the largest volcanic lake in the world. Located in the centre of North Sumatra, the lake can be reached via Parapat (Simalungun regency), Tongging (Karo regency), and Balige (Toba Samosir regency).
 Samosir Island is a volcanic island in middle of Lake Toba, It is a popular tourist destination due to its exotic Batak history and the vistas it offers. The tourist resorts are concentrated in the Tuktuk, Tomok, Simanindo, and Pangururan areas.
 Bukit Lawang known for the largest animal sanctuary of Sumatran orangutan (around 5,000 orangutans occupy the area), and also the main access point to the Gunung Leuser National Park from the east side.
 Nias Island is an island off the western coast of Sumatra. Nias is an internationally popular surfing destination where many international surfing competitions are held. The best known surfing area is Sorake Bay, close to the town of Teluk Dalam, on the southern tip. This is enclosed by the beaches of Lagundri and Sorake. Tourists can visit the island by plane from Medan, or by ferry from Sibolga.
 Bawomataluo village is a settlement in Teluk Dalam of the South Nias Regency of Indonesia. The village was built on a flat-topped hill, the name Bawomataluo meaning "Sun Hill", and is one of the best-preserved villages built in traditional style.
 Berastagi is a small highland town located 63 kilometres to the south of Medan, and is a popular weekend destination for city dwellers due to its chilled and fresh mountain air.
 Dolok Tinggi Raja has a unique soil colour is white because it is located in a limestone hill that resembles snow, and also in the middle of this area there are lakes with hot blue-green coloured water, located in Tinggi Raja, Simalungun.
 Lumbini Natural Park is a Buddhist Theravada-style temple that is similar to Shwedagon Pagoda in Myanmar located in Berastagi.
 Kolam Abadi Pelaruga, a blue crystal river located in Rumah Galuh, Langkat Regency, 50 km from Medan
 Poncan Island is a resort including a beach, located on west offshore of Sibolga city.
 Berhala Island is a 2.5 hectares island located in the Malaka Strait near the boundary of Indonesia and Malaysia. It is a popular place for snorkeling and watching turtle nesting. Visitors can reach the island via boat from Sergei in the Serdang Bedagai regency.
 Sipisopiso, one of the highest waterfalls in Indonesia, is located near Tongging in Karo regency, about 1 hour drive from Berastagi.
 Simalem Resort, is a 5 star resort located around 8 km from Munthe village, Karo Regency. This place is the good place for sightseeing the whole Lake Toba from top of the hill.
 Taman Iman, Indonesian name for The Garden of Faith located in Sitinjo village, Dairi around 10 km away from Sidikalang, it is a religious garden with dioramas from 5 religion of Indonesia (Islam, Christian, Buddhist, Hindu, and Confucian).

 Bahal temple, an ancient Buddhist monastery located in Padang Bolak, Padang Lawas Regency, around 3 hours journey with car from Padangsidempuan. The temple is believed to be constructed between the 11th to 13th century AD.
 Sigura-Gura Waterfall located in Porsea, Toba Samosir Regency, this is a waterfall that has a height that reaches 250 metres.
 Rahmat International Wildlife Museum and Gallery, is a natural history museum in Medan. The museum displays various taxidermy collections of wildlife from the smallest to the largest according to the habitat.

 Tangkahan is a tourist site situated at the edge of the Gunung Leuser national park, around 20 km due north from Bukit Lawang, The main tourist draw at Tangkahan is the presence of Sumatran elephant.
 Salib Kasih, Indonesian name for Love Cross, located in Tarutung. The development objective of this cross-shaped monument is to commemorate the service and dedication of Dr. Ludwig Ingwer Nommensen which is a missionary from northern Germany. This Parks built on Dolok (Hill) Siatas Barita.
 Lingga is one of the village in the Karo Regency. Located at an altitude of about 1200 m above sea level, approximately 15 km from Brastagi and 5 km from the Kabanjahe. Linga is unique Karo traditional house and village that has been built an estimated of 250 years ago, but still sturdy.
 Tanjungbalai is an old city situated approximately 180 km from Medan, the capital city of Sumatera Utara. In fact, it holds the last train station from the capital city. You can enjoy range of seafood and modern dishes at traditional restaurants and modern ones. The town boasts its sea produces such as fish and clams in various species. There is some sections of this town that still bears historical building established in the Dutch colonial. The cost to come to this town is the cheapest by train spending around 4 hours. You can either do a day trip or stay for a week to get a better look at the once busiest Dutch financial district in the east coast of Sumatera Utara.

Transportation

Airports

The modern Kualanamu International Airport was opened on July 25, 2013, and is located almost 40 kilometres from Medan. The airport replaces the old Polonia International Airport. It serves flights to several Indonesian and Malaysian cities, along with flights to Singapore, Thailand, Hong Kong, and Saudi Arabia. In passenger numbers, Kualanamu is the fifth largest airport in Indonesia.

Other airports in North Sumatra are:
 Lasondre Airport in Batu Islands
 Binaka Airport in Gunung Sitoli, Nias Island
 Aek Godang Airport in Padang Sidempuan, South Tapanauli Regency
 Sibisa Airport in Ajibata, Toba Samosir Regency
 Ferdinand Lumban Tobing Airport or Pinangsori Airport in Sibolga, Centra Tapanauli Regency
 Silangit Airport, in Siborong-Borong

Seaports
North Sumatra has an international seaport at Belawan, near Medan and is now preparing to have a new seaport at Kuala Tanjung, in Batubara Regency, for about Rp1 trillion ($114 million) budget.

Road

In North Sumatra, there is 2098.05 kilometres down a state-road, which pertained only steady 1095.70 kilometres or 52.22 percent and 418.60 kilometres or 19.95 percent in a state of being, remaining in a state of disrepair. While of 2752.41 kilometres of provincial roads, which is in a state of steady length 1237.60 kilometres or 44.96 per cent, while in a state of being 558.46 kilometres, or 20.29 percent. As damaged roads length 410.40 kilometres, or 14.91 percent, and the damaged length 545.95 kilometres, or 19.84 percent.

There are 28 km toll road (expressway) in named as Belmera Toll Road, the first toll road in Medan, connecting from Belawan to Tanjungmorawa, passing east side of the city, the government also on has built a 62 km Medan–Kualanamu–Tebing Tinggi Toll Road and 17 km Medan–Binjai Toll Road. A project to built toll road from Tebing Tinggi to Parapat and also from Tebing Tinggi to Kisaran and Kisaran to Rantauprapat down south to Bagan Batu, Riau also in proportion, meanwhile in the north, a toll project connecting Binjai to Aceh's eastern city, Langsa and up to Banda Aceh are also on going. There are under discussion to build Medan inner ring-road toll road, including a elevated tollway above Deli River to accelerate city traffic.

Rail
Regional Division I North Sumatra and Aceh or Divre I is regional railway from Aceh to North Sumatra operated by Kereta Api Indonesia, but only in-operation railway are from Binjai to Medan (Sri Lelawangsa), Medan to Pematangsiantar (Siantar Express), Medan to Tanjungbalai (Putri Deli) and Medan to Rantau Parapat (Sribilah), there are an underconstruction rail way to Banda Aceh in Aceh province also to Pekanbaru, Riau province. Medan also has it first airport rail link in Indonesia, called Kualanamu Airport Rail Link. It connects the city to Kualanamu Airport.

See also

 List of people from North Sumatra

References

External links

 North Sumatra Government

 
Provinces of Indonesia
Andaman Sea